The Jules Horowitz Reactor (Réacteur Jules Horowitz or RJH) is a Material Test Reactor (MTR) cooled and moderated with water. It is under construction at Cadarache in southern France, based on the recommendations of the European Roadmap for Research Infrastructures Report, which was published by the European Strategy Forum on Research Infrastructures (ESFRI) in 2006. The reactor, which is named for the 20th-century French nuclear scientist Jules Horowitz, is planned to begin operation between 2026 and 2028.

Project background and funding
The Jules Horowitz Reactor's construction was recommended by ESFRI as a replacement for the European Union's existing materials testing reactors, which were all built in the 1960s, and are expected to reach the end of their service lives by 2020. The reactor is being built under the framework of an international consortium of research institutes, including France's CEA, the Czech Republic's NRI, Spain's CIEMAT, Finland's VTT, Belgium's SCK•CEN, the United Kingdom's NNL and the European Commission, along with private companies such as Electricité de France (EDF), Vattenfall and Areva. There are two non-European associate partners to the consortium; India's DAE and Japan's JAEA. The construction of the reactor was funded by CEA (which provided 50% of the project's funding), EDF (20%), various EU research institutes (20%) and Areva (10%). In the framework of the IAEA ICERR label (International Centre based on Research Reactors), the JHR will be also available to institutions from IAEA Member States for education, and joint research and development (R&D) projects.

Design
The Jules Horowitz Reactor is a materials testing reactor, with a power output of approximately 100 megawatts. It has a planned service lifespan of around 50 years, and is designed to be adaptable for a variety of research uses by nuclear utilities, nuclear steam system suppliers, nuclear fuel manufacturers, research organisations and safety authorities. The reactor's versatile modular design allows it to accommodate up to 20 simultaneous experiments. Its instrumentation allows previously unavailable real-time analysis to be performed. Its primary uses will be research into the performance of nuclear fuel at existing reactors, testing of materials used in reactors, testing designs for fuel for future reactors and the production of radioisotopes for use in medicine. The reactor is intended to produce radioisotopes in coordination with existing production facilities at Petten in the Netherlands. The reactor's coolant flow is ascending, in the order of nearly 2.36 m3/s, with maximum pressure in the order of 1.0-1.5 MPa, depending on the required flow and the core head loss.

Construction
Site preparation for the project began at the Cadarache nuclear research complex in March 2007. The first concrete for the reactor's foundations was poured in August 2009, and the central containment structure was completed with the addition of a 105-tonne dome in December 2013. A senior vice president of General Atomics claimed during testimony before US House members that operation started in 2014.

In December 2020, Constructions industrielles de la Méditerranée delivered the reactor battery block of the JHR.

References

External links

Official site

Nuclear research reactors
Buildings and structures under construction in France
Nuclear technology in France
Research institutes in France
2016 establishments in France